Sallim gyeongje, roughly translated as "Farm Management", is a Korean book regarding living and farming written by Hong Man-seon (流巖 洪萬選, 1643-1715). The book was written around the turn of the 18th century. It consists of four books and sixteen chapters and is regarded as one of the most important Korean works of the period. It is the first book in Korea to describe the cultivation of chili peppers.

Contents

Book One
Seo (序): Prologue
Bok Geo (卜居): The building of houses
Sup Saeng (攝生): Health
Chi Nong (治農): The growing of cotton, grain, and other special plants
Chi Po (治圃): The growing of vegetables, flowers, tobacco

Book Two
Jong Su (種樹): The growing of fruits and trees
Yang Hwa (養花): The trimming of flowers and garden plants
Yang Jam (養蠶): Beekeeping
Mok Yang (牧養): The farming of animals, fish, and bees
Chi Seon (治膳): The storing, cooking, and processing of food

Book Three
Gu Geup (救急): Emergency treatments
Gu Hwang (救荒): Emergency procedures for droughts
Byeok On (辟瘟): Ways to stop contagious diseases
Byeok Choong (辟蟲): How to get rid of pests

Book Four
Chi Yak (治藥): Medicine
Sun Taek (選擇): The choosing of lucky and unlucky days and directions
Jap Bang (雜方): How to take care of swords, pottery, musical instruments and other things

See also
Siui jeonseo
Jibong yuseol
Sarye pyeollam
Jeungbo sallim gyeongje

References

External links
 Sallim gyeongje (Korean)
Korean Wiki

Joseon dynasty works